Zoe Bertram is an Australian actress, whose first major role was in the teen-oriented television soap opera The Restless Years as Olivia Baxter from 1977 to 1981.

Career 
Bertram has guested in numerous television series and appeared in movies, as well as on stage. She is probably better known to international audiences for playing Randi Goodlove in Prisoner in 1983.

In 1991 she starred in the series Animal Park.

In 2009–2010 she appeared in a series of television advertisements for Australian Pensioners Insurance.

In July 2011, Bertram joined the cast of Neighbours as Lorraine Dowski. She re-joined the cast in the recurring role of Fay Brennan in 2017 and made her first onscreen appearance on 28 July.

Filmography 
FILM

TELEVISION

References

External links
 

Living people
Year of birth missing (living people)
Australian television actresses